Westlinton (or West Linton) is a small village and civil parish in Cumbria, England.  It is in the City of Carlisle district, and is located north of Carlisle, on the A7 road between Carlisle and Longtown.  In the south of the parish, and also on the A7, is another small village, Blackford.  In the 2001 census, the parish had a population of 359,  increasing to 380 at the 2011 census.  North of the village of Westlinton is the River Lyne, which forms the northern boundary of the parish.

See also

Listed buildings in Westlinton

References

External links

 Cumbria County History Trust: Westlinton (nb: provisional research only – see Talk page)

Villages in Cumbria
City of Carlisle
Civil parishes in Cumbria